Robert Streb (born April 7, 1987) is an American professional golfer who plays on the PGA Tour where he has been a member since 2013.

Streb was born in Chickasha, Oklahoma, and earned All-American honors while playing collegiate golf at Kansas State University. He  graduated in 2009 and subsequently turned professional. He is noted as a user of the ten-finger grip, which is unusual on the PGA Tour.

Professional career
Streb played on the NGA Pro Golf Tour in 2010 and 2011 and the Web.com Tour in 2012. He won his first title on the Web.com Tour at the Mylan Classic in September, and finished T-3 at the BMW Charity Pro-Am and T-4 at the South Georgia Classic. He finished 7th on the 2012 money list to earn his PGA Tour card for 2013.

In his first PGA Tour season, Streb's best results were T-16 at the Humana Challenge, T-18 at the Honda Classic and T-22 at the Shell Houston Open. He finished 126th in the FedEx Cup standings, one spot short of the playoffs and fully exempt status for 2014. The next season, he was runner-up at the Zurich Classic of New Orleans and T-9 at the Deutsche Bank Championship. He finished 71st in the 2014 FedEx Cup.

In the 2015 PGA Tour season, Streb earned his first PGA Tour win at the 2014 McGladrey Classic at the Sea Island Golf Club on St. Simons Island, Georgia. He had six other top-10 finishes including a playoff loss at the Greenbrier Classic and an 18th place finish on the 2015 FedEx Cup Standings.

At the 2016 PGA Championship at Baltusrol Golf Club, Streb fired a second round 63 to tie the best round in a major and joined Jimmy Walker as the 36-hole leader in the event, with a 9 under par total. Streb carded a two-over-par 72 during the third round, that pushed him back into a tie for fifth entering the final round. He finished the tournament tied for seventh.

In November 2020, Streb won in a playoff over Kevin Kisner at the RSM Classic, giving him his second PGA Tour victory (both at the same tournament), and his first in six years.

Professional wins (6)

PGA Tour wins (2)

PGA Tour playoff record (2–1)

Web.com Tour wins (2)

Web.com Tour playoff record (1–0)

Other wins (2)
2009 Oklahoma Open
2011 Oklahoma Open

Results in major championships
Results not in chronological order in 2020.

CUT = missed the half-way cut
"T" = tied
NT = No tournament due to COVID-19 pandemic

Summary

Most consecutive cuts made – 3 (2015 U.S. Open – 2015 PGA)
Longest streak of top-10s – 1 (twice)

Results in The Players Championship

CUT = missed the halfway cut
"T" indicates a tie for a place
C = Canceled after the first round due to the COVID-19 pandemic

Results in World Golf Championships

1Cancelled due to COVID-19 pandemic

NT = No tournament
"T" = Tied

See also
2012 Web.com Tour graduates
2018 Web.com Tour Finals graduates
2019 Korn Ferry Tour Finals graduates

References

External links

American male golfers
Kansas State Wildcats men's golfers
PGA Tour golfers
Korn Ferry Tour graduates
Golfers from Oklahoma
People from Chickasha, Oklahoma
Sportspeople from Edmond, Oklahoma
1987 births
Living people